Geocoris uliginosus is a species of big-eyed bug in the family Geocoridae. It is found in North America.

References

Lygaeoidea
Hemiptera of North America
Insects described in 1832
Taxa named by Thomas Say
Articles created by Qbugbot